Badalona is a municipality to the immediate north east of Barcelona in Catalonia, Spain. It is located on the left bank of the Besòs River and on the Mediterranean Sea, in the Barcelona metropolitan area. By population, it is the third largest city in Catalonia and the twenty-third in Spain. It became a city in 1897.

Names 
The name Badalona comes from ancient Iberian word Baitolo according to the legend of several bronze coins of the end of the 2nd century BC found in the city. This word was the origin of the Latin name Baetulo that was as the Romans named the new city they founded off the coast of present Badalona. The oldest mention of the name Baetulo is from De Chorographia of Pomponius Mela (43–44 AD), who use the same name for the Besòs river (named Bissaucio during the Middle Ages). Following the Roman era, during the High Middle Ages the name Baetulo evolved to Bitulona, which was the most common name but not the only one, because it is found in the Latin written documents other versions as Bedelona, Bitilona, Betulona, Bedalona and even Vitulona. The current name is documented already in 997 and by the 14th century was the most used and generalized.

History
The old remains of settlement are dated of the middle-new Neolithic (about 3500–2500 BC). The archeological finds consist of carved stone and silex tools which were found in Seriol hill and Manresà area and tombs with grave goods in Sistrells and Llefià quarters. Deposits of the bronze and Iron Age have been found in old brickyards (dated about 1800–1500 BC) many years ago and in the masies of Can Butinyà and Can Mora in the Canyet quarter (1500–1100 BC).

Before the settlement of the Romans in Hispania the territory of Badalona was populated by Iberians who were settled over the Boscà hill (198 metres above the sea level), from where it is possible to watch the coastline. The settlement is first dated at least on the 4th century BC and was totally abandoned by the 1st century AD due to the romanization. Despite the presence of the Iberians, the origins of the city usually are date around the year 100 BC, when the Romans founded a city ex novo on Rosés hill (26,8 metres) next to the coast. The Roman town's plan was based on their common scheme of the cardo and decumanus, occupying some 10 ha, with a line of walls. The Roman city was very dynamic, especially during the reign of Augustus, with an specialised vineyard agriculture destined to produce wine to export all over the empire. From the 3rd century, the city started declining and was almost depopulated and people fled to rustic villae. However, the few remains of the Late antiquity prove that Baetulo was never abandoned.

The current Badalona was formed in the 10th century, as a new urban nucleus built over the old Roman city and around the old forum and temple which was turned into a church. At the same time, a rural nucleus grew up outside the town walls. This rural and urban dichotomy would remain until the mid-18th century.

Sant Jeroni de la Murtra Monastery, built in the 14th century, is where the Catholic Monarchs would spend their summers. According to some authors, this is also where they received Christopher Columbus after his first voyage to the Americas.

During the 19th century Badalona remained as an agricultural and fishing centre, however this changed since 1848 with the arrival of the railway connecting the cities of Mataró and Barcelona, whose line installed a station in the village. This furthered the industrialization and economic development of Badalona and progressively made the traditional economic sectors decline. Because of the installation of industries, Badalona also became an important labour movement centre. Thanks to this, the village became a people attraction pole that doubled its population from 5.733 (1851) to 10.485 (1857) inhabitants, and by the end of the century Badalona had around 19.000 inhabitants. The demographic growth implied a new urbanistic development with an ensanche plan covering all along the coast from Sant Adrià to Montgat. In 1897, the city received the title of city from the queen regent Maria Christina of Austria.

The first third of the 20th century the city continued growing demographically, usually without control that implied the creation of new neighbourhoods that hadn't had urban infrastructures and were bad communicated with the centre of the city. During the dictatorship of Primo de Rivera the city council tried to reduce the problems of the city doing public works and constructed a new school, market and slaughterhouse and expanded sewage network, however this was not enough. During the years of the Second Republic the city was mainly in turmoil as well as during the civil war, when the city was bombed because it was an important industrial centre. After the end of the war, in 1940 the mayor Frederic Xifré was executed by the francoists.

The dictatorship of Franco meant a decline of the many cultural life that Badalona had before the war. The period was also marked with the new immigrants arrivals mainly from the south of Spain, which made the city grow demographically even more quickly than before, that supposed the emergence of shanties neighbourhood with unhealthy conditions. The city went having 92.200 inhabitants in 1960 to 201.200 only fifteen years later. During the mandate of the mayor Felipe Antoja the city accepted the arrival of poor people from Barcelona who lived in shanties and the creation of poor-quality neighbourhoods that made Badalona one of the worst living places quality. The urbanistic policy also was not lenient with historical buildings or archaeological sites.

Since the death of Franco, and especially from 1979, the city had a new social vitality with the organised neighbours’ movement that fought to get the lacking infrastructures of their neighbourhoods and the real estate speculation and obtained urban improvements. In fact, Badalona held the first tolerated demonstration and without violence the 29 January 1976. From this moment the city also suffered an economic transformation from an industrial to a services centre. In 1992 Badalona was sub-seat of the Olympic Games and was where the basket and boxing competitions were held. Despite that Badalona is included in the Barcelona conurbation still have its own identity, especially in the centric neighbourhoods.

Climate

Administrative divisions 
Badalona has 34 neighbourhoods and 6 districts. Before the 20th century, the municipality was divided in 5 traditional quarters known as la Sagrera, Llefià, Sistrells, Canyet and Pomar. However, due to the growth of the population during the 20th century, the city was administratively divided into more neighbourhoods and new districts grouping each one several of them. The current division is dated of 1980, except for a modification in 2011 which reduced the districts from 8 to 6. The districts and their neighbourhoods are as follows:

 District 1: Canyadó, Casagemes, Centre, Coll i Pujol, Dalt de la Vila, El Manresà and El Progrés.
 District 2: Montigalà (western section), Nova Lloreda, Sant Crist de Can Cabanyes, Sistrells, La Pau and Puigfred.
 District 3: Montigalà (eastern section), Canyet, Mas Ram, Bufalà, Pomar, Pomar de Dalt, Bonavista, Les Guixeres and Morera.
 District 4: La Salut, Sant Antoni de Llefià, Sant Joan de Llefià, Sant Mori de Llefià.
 District 5: Gorg, La Mora, Congrés, Can Claris and El Raval.
 District 6: Artigues, El Remei and Sant Roc.

Transportation

Badalona has a Renfe train station R1 from Barcelona to Mataró – Blanes, as well as a harbour. There are also links to Barcelona via the Barcelona Metropolitan Transport (TMB) metro (underground) and bus system, as well as the Trambesòs line.

Population
Badalona has the second-largest Moroccan and Pakistani populations of Catalonia. Other significant communities include Chinese and Indians.

Economy
The economy of Badalona is mainly based on the service sector, although traditionally was an important industrial centre. The primary sector as agriculture and fishing were also remarkable. However, those activities declined throughout the 20th century. In 2017 Badalona's GDP worth 4.122,9 million Euros, of which 3.020 (79,9%) corresponds to services, 501,8 to industry (13,3%), to construction (6,9%) and a tiny part (less than 1%) to agriculture.

About the primary sector, in the one hand since 2004, agriculture in Badalona basically consists only of the vineyards of the masia of Can Coll, and more recently, since 2019, vineyards haven been planted next to the monastery Sant Jeroni de la Murtra by a cooperative. Both farms are in the neighbourhood of Canyet. Since 2012 Badalona is part of Alella DO. On the other hand, fishing is a residual sector, the lack of a port in the city until 2005 made the fishers going to work to other ports like Barcelona, Vilanova i la Geltrú or Blanes. The port, managed by Marina Badalona, is dedicated mainly to marina, however it also has a fishing part and a fish market, but there are few fishers nowadays.

Industry was a key sector in Badalona for many years, since the arrival of the train in 1848. The old village grown and appeared a lot of factories from different sectors (chemical, metallurgical, food and liquors, etc.). All changed the last decades of the 20th century, many industries left the city because the contamination. Since then Badalona developed specific industrial zones as Les Guixeres, where the city council constructed the Badalona International Business Center, with the aim of improving the services, external projection, exchanges and competitiveness in the European and American market of the companies based in Badalona. The main sectors are microelectronics and robotics, followed by packaging and aerosols, textile machinery and industrials molds.

Culture

In May, in occasion of the celebration of Saint Anastasi, the patron saint of Badalona, activities and festivals are organized all around the city. The most important celebration takes place the day before Saint Anastasi Day when, at night, people gather at the maritime promenade to participate in the popular Cremada del Dimoni (Devil-Burning)--similar to the famous Valencian Falles.

Tourism 
Badalona is popular stop for tourists. The city has its own touristic route featuring the old town of Dalt de la Vila with stops in the Church of Santa Maria, the Old Tower and some medieval streets, besides some modernist houses. From there and following Costa street, it shows the Baix a Mar or Centre area, which concentrates a wide range of shops, restaurants, bars, and cafes. Key tourist stops include:

 Monastery of Sant Jeroni de la Murtra.
 Old Roman Baetulo, in the Museum of Badalona.
 Iberian settlement of turó d'en Boscà.
 City beach.
 Annual Burning of the Devil during Festes de Maig.

Sport
The city's most important sport complex is the Palau Municipal d'Esports de Badalona (Municipal Sports Palace), which won the Mies Van der Rohe award in 1992. The Palace was the setting for basketball competition during the Olympic Games in 1992. Nowadays, it is home of the basketball team from Badalona, Joventut Badalona, also known as la Penya. This place will also be the centre of the Badalona Capital Europea del Bàsquet, which is intended to be a theme park celebrating basketball – with a basketball museum, shopping center, cinemas, basketball courts, a harbour, indoor karting and more activities.

Twin towns
Alcanar, Spain
San Fernando, Spain
Parla, Spain
Valparaíso, Chile
Gothenburg, Sweden
Sitges, Spain

Notable people 

 Vicenç Bosch (1845–1907), businessman
 Francesc Planas (1845–1911), journalist
 Antoni Bori (1861–1912), writer and teacher
 Enric Borràs (1863–1957), theatre actor
 Llorenç Brunet (1873–1939), illustrator
 Joan Amigó (1875–1959), architect
 Joaquim Trias (1888–1964), doctor
 Antoni Trias (1892–1970), doctor
 Antoni Botey (1896–1939), composer and musician
 Josep Maria Cuyàs (1904–1992), historian and archeologist
 Anna Tugas (1911–2015), athlete
 Francesc Xavier Estruch (1912–1999), basketball player and trainer
 Joan Forns (1916–1998), illusionist
 Josep Gual (1920–2005), poet
 Pere Rovira (1921–1978), dressmaker
 Joan Argenté (1931–2015), poet
 Josep Lluís (1937–2018), basketball player and trainer
 Jordi Dauder (1938–2011), actor
 Julià de Jòdar (born 1942), writer
 Joaquim Torrents (1946–1993), painter
 Enric Juliana (born 1956), journalist
 Lluïsa Cunillé (born 1961), playwright
 Tomàs Molina (born 1963), meteorologist
 Jorge Javier Vázquez (born 1970), TV personality
 Melani Olivares (born 1973), actress
 Juan Magán (born 1978), DJ and singer
 Isaac Sánchez "Loulogio" (born 1983), comedian
 Pau Ribas (born 1987), basketball player
 Mireia Belmonte (born 1990), swimmer
 Héctor Bellerín (born 1995), football player

See also
CF Badalona (Spanish League – 2nd division)
Institute of Predictive and Personalized Medicine of Cancer
Joventut Badalona (basketball team) in Liga ACB
Palau Municipal d'Esports de Badalona (Olympic basketball seat '92)

Notes

References
 Panareda Clopés, Josep Maria; Rios Calvet, Jaume; Rabella Vives, Josep Maria (1989). Guia de Catalunya, Barcelona: Caixa de Catalunya.  (Spanish).  (Catalan).

External links

Official site 
 Government data pages 
Information from the Diputació de Barcelona 

 
Populated places in Barcelonès